Senator Costa may refer to:

Catherine A. Costa (born 1926), New Jersey State Senate
Jay Costa (born 1957), Pennsylvania State Senate
Jim Costa (born 1952), California State Senate
William P. Costas (1927–2013), Indiana State Senate